A gale is a strong wind; the word is typically used as a descriptor in nautical contexts. The U.S. National Weather Service defines a gale as sustained surface winds moving at a speed of between 34 and 47 knots (or ). Forecasters typically issue gale warnings when winds of this strength are expected. In the United States, a gale warning is specifically a maritime warning; the land-based equivalent in National Weather Service warning products is a wind advisory.

The  definition is very non-standard.

It is an empirical measure for describing wind speed based mainly on observed sea conditions. On the original 1810 Beaufort wind force scale, there were four different "gale" designations whereas generally today there are two gale forces, 8 and 9, and a near gale 7:

Etymology 
The word gale is derived from the Middle English gale, a general word for wind of any strength, even a breeze. This word is probably of North Germanic origin, related to Icelandic gola (breeze) and Danish gal (furious, mad), which are both from Old Norse gala (to sing), from Proto-Germanic *galaną (to roop, sing, charm), from Proto-Indo-European *gʰel- (to shout, scream, charm away). One online etymology website suggests that the word gale is derived from an earlier spelling, gail, which it claims is of uncertain origin.

References 

Wind
Seas